The New York Cosmos Stadium was a proposed  25,000-seat soccer-specific stadium and multipurpose facility.  It was to be located in the New York metropolitan area in Nassau County, just over the city border.  Plans were submitted to New York's Empire State Development Corporation.  Upon completion, it would have been the home stadium of the New York Cosmos.  The plan was abandoned in 2016.

Plan
The stadium was intended to be part of a privately financed $400 million entertainment complex known as Elmont Town Crossings, designed to be built within Belmont Park.  Along with the stadium, the project would have included a Cosmos museum, nearly 250,000 square feet of retail space and restaurants, a 175-room hotel, a pedestrian bridge over Hempstead Turnpike, better road access along the Hempstead Turnpike and Cross Island Parkway, improvements to the LIRR Belmont Park station, new parking space, a new 4.3-acre park, a youth soccer field, and remodeled recreational soccer fields nearby.  Team officials said the project would have created 500 construction jobs and 3,000 permanent, full-time jobs.

A team  of architects, engineers, and contractors were assembled for the stadium project including Populous, the Spector Group, Cameron Engineering, Turner Construction Company, and McKissack & McKissack.

Uses
The Cosmos had said the stadium would be host not only to their own matches but also to national and international soccer events, other sports (such as rugby and lacrosse), music concerts, and other local sports teams.

Given the site's location away from subway lines, and close only to a infrequently-serviced Long Island Rail Road spur line, soccer consultant Jeff L’Hote questioned whether it would be "an attractive location" for a soccer stadium. 

Sports commentators speculated that, once built, the Cosmos stadium might be used as leverage to join Major League Soccer on favorable terms if the league was unable to build its own a stadium in the city.

Timeline
In 2012, the New York Empire State Development Corporation issued a request for proposals (RFP) to develop an area of underutilized land at Belmont Park.  In January 2013, the New York Cosmos submitted their plan.

While the RFPs were being evaluated, the New York Cosmos began play at James M. Shuart Stadium at Hofstra University. The new stadium was originally aimed to be completed in 2015 and opened by 2016, but had to be pushed back as time elapsed without a decision from the ESDC.

In November 2015, the ESDC asked all bidders to revise and re-submit their proposals.  The Cosmos revised their plan to remove one parcel of land. The project was one of four proposals resubmitted to the ESDC.

On December 9, 2016, the Empire State Development Corporation officially withdrew the RFP, rejecting all four plans.  After a second round of proposals (in which the Cosmos did not participate), the NHL's New York Islanders were chosen in December 2017 to develop the site with an 18,000 seat arena.

References

External links
Gallery of renderings at Spector Group
New York Cosmos Stadium video animation

New York Cosmos
Multi-purpose stadiums in the United States
North American Soccer League stadiums
Soccer venues in the New York metropolitan area
Sports venues in Hempstead, New York
Sports venues in Nassau County, New York
Sports venues in the New York metropolitan area
Proposed buildings and structures in New York (state)
Unbuilt stadiums in the United States